Charlottesville High School is a public high school in the independent city of Charlottesville, Virginia, serving students from 9th to 12th grade. It is a part of Charlottesville City Schools.

It is the second largest high school in the region with a student population of approximately 1,200. The school grounds include a memorial garden, a running track, ballfields, landscaped courtyards and the Martin Luther King Jr. Performing Arts Center (or "MLK PAC"). Across Melbourne Road lies Theodose Stadium, which doubles as the field hockey stadium during the fall, and soccer and lacrosse stadium during the Spring season.

University Gardens, a University of Virginia family housing unit, is zoned to Charlottesville High School.

History 
Charlottesville High School was founded by John Cunningham in 1904 and was built in 1974 because the Lane High School building had become too small to accommodate all students within the city limits. Lane High school saw its last graduating class in June, 1974. CHS opened its doors in September, 1974. The new school inherited their school colors (black & orange) as well as their mascot (the Black Knight) from the former high school. Lane High School was never demolished and is now the Albemarle County office building. Charlottesville High School's sports complex was still located on the grounds of the Lane High School building until the 1980s, when it was moved to a site across the street from CHS. During the last 20 years of the 20th century, CHS has had some major additions including a new gym facility and a large auditorium.

Renovations started in 2004, lasting two years, and included a fresh coat of paint, updated class rooms, larger and modern restroom facilities, updated ventilation systems, new lockers, and new, asbestos-free floor tile.

Athletics 
CHS has many athletic programs, ranging from football to tennis, track and field to field hockey. Recent highlights include soccer (boys') winning a state championship in 2004. The Charlottesville High School boys soccer team also won the state championships in 2019.

Performing arts 
In 1984, the 1,276-seat Performing Arts Center of Charlottesville (PAC) was built to address both the shortage of auditorium space for the high school as well as the area's need for a large venue to accommodate professional touring performances, such as the Richmond Symphony Orchestra, Russian Ballet, and the Charlottesville performance of A Prairie Home Companion. In the fall of 2005, Charlottesville City Council decided to rechristen the Performing Arts Center of Charlottesville as "The Martin Luther King Jr. Performing Arts Center of Charlottesville" (MLK PAC), in order to honor the civil rights activist. Sixty dates during the school year are reserved for school-sponsored events such as assemblies and the school's performing arts program.

Notable alumni
 Lloyd Burruss, former NFL player for the Kansas City Chiefs
 Eric Wilson, former NFL player for the Buffalo Bills
Rashard Davis NFL player for a number of teams.
Mike Cubbage, former MLB baseball player
Larry Mitchell, Former MLB player (Philadelphia Phillies)
 Eugene Puryear, vice presidential candidate of the Party for Socialism and Liberation in the 2008 United States presidential election
 Boyd Tinsley, violinist, mandolinist, and singer, formerly of the Dave Matthews Band
 Will Anderson, vocalist and guitarist for the band Parachute
 Alex Plank (Class of  2005)  autism advocate and founder of Wrong Planet web forums
Nikuyah Walker, Mayor of Charlottesville (2018-2022)

References

External links

Charlottesville High School

 Martin Luther King Jr. Performing Arts Center of Charlottesville

Schools in Charlottesville, Virginia
Public high schools in Virginia
Educational institutions established in 1974